Gerrit Alan Cole (born September 8, 1990) is an American professional baseball pitcher for the New York Yankees of Major League Baseball (MLB). He previously played for the Pittsburgh Pirates and Houston Astros. Cole played for the baseball team at Orange Lutheran High School, and was selected by the New York Yankees in the first round of the 2008 MLB Draft. Cole opted not to sign, and instead attended the University of California, Los Angeles (UCLA), where he played college baseball for the UCLA Bruins.

After his college baseball career the Pirates made Cole the first overall selection in the 2011 MLB draft. He made his MLB debut in 2013, and was named the National League (NL) Rookie of the Month in September 2013. He was named the NL Pitcher of the Month for April 2015, and an MLB All-Star in 2015. The Pirates traded Cole to the Astros in the 2017–18 offseason. On September 18, 2019, Cole became the 18th pitcher in major league history to strike out at least 300 batters in a season. On December 16, 2019, the Yankees signed Cole to a franchise record nine-year, $324 million contract, the largest contract total in major league history for a pitcher.

Cole is a member of the 2022 class of the UCLA Athletics Hall of Fame. He also is the franchise record-holder for strikeouts in a single season for both the Astros (2019) and the Yankees (2022), with 324 and 257 respectively. Cole has received controversy for his role in the 2021 pitch doctoring controversy.

Early life

Cole attended Orange Lutheran High School. In his sophomore year, Cole pitched for the school's junior varsity baseball team, allowing no runs in 45 innings pitched. He gained national attention while pitching for the varsity team in his junior year, as his fastball reached . He reached  in a showcase for the best prep school talents, and close to 50 scouts attended the first game of his senior season. In his senior year, Cole pitched to an 8–2 win–loss record and a 0.47 earned run average (ERA), while also recording 121 strikeouts in 75 innings.

In 2008, USA Today named Cole to their All-USA high school baseball team. Baseball America rated him the 17th-best prospect available in the 2008 Major League Baseball draft. He was named the starting pitcher of the 2008 Orange County North–South All-Star Game.

After his senior year the New York Yankees selected Cole in the first round, with the 28th overall selection, of the 2008 Major League Baseball draft, becoming the first player ever drafted out of Orange Lutheran High School. The Yankees were reportedly planning on offering Cole a $4 million signing bonus, which was above the recommended amount for the slot. As the Yankees planned to give Cole a large bonus to sign, they waited until the deadline to attempt to sign him. By the time the deadline approached, Cole and his family had considered many variables, comparing players who sign out of high school to those who go to college, and decided to follow through with his commitment to attend the University of California, Los Angeles (UCLA) on a college baseball scholarship. Despite being represented by Scott Boras, and though the Yankees were believed to be ready to offer upwards of $4 million, Cole never negotiated with the Yankees, as he was determined to attend college. He majored in political science and theater at UCLA.

College career
John Savage, coach of the UCLA Bruins, made Cole the team's Friday night starting pitcher in his freshman year. That season, Cole recorded a 4–8 win–loss record with a 3.49 ERA, collecting 104 strikeouts in 85 innings. Cole was a member of the 2009 United States collegiate national baseball team and was named to the 2010 Collegiate National Team roster. He competed in the 2010 World University Baseball Championship.

During UCLA's 2010 season, Cole and Trevor Bauer contributed in making the Bruins the best baseball team (51–17 record) in school history and the second-best team in the country. Cole had an 11–4 win–loss record, a 3.37 ERA, and 153 strikeouts in 123 innings. His 153 strikeouts placed Cole third among collegiate pitchers. The Bruins went on to play in the 2010 College World Series, but were defeated by South Carolina in the NCAA Championship Series.

Cole's statistics declined in 2011, his junior year. He finished the season with a 6–8 win–loss record and a 3.31 ERA, with 119 strikeouts in  innings.

Professional career

Draft and minor leagues
Heading into the 2011 MLB draft, Cole, Bauer, and Danny Hultzen who was also a college pitcher, were seen as among the best available talents in the draft. The Pittsburgh Pirates selected Cole with the first overall selection. He signed a minor league contract with an $8 million signing bonus, the highest signing bonus ever offered to a rookie, 15 minutes before the signing deadline on August 15, 2011. Though he signed too late to pitch in the 2011 minor league season, he pitched for the Mesa Solar Sox of the Arizona Fall League (AFL). He recorded 16 strikeouts in 15 innings pitched for the Solar Sox and had a 3.00 earned run average (ERA) and a 0.93 walks plus hits per inning pitched ratio (WHIP). He was selected to start the AFL Rising Stars game in November 2011.

The Pirates invited Cole to spring training in 2012 as a non-roster invitee, but they optioned him to the minor leagues. Cole started the 2012 season with the Bradenton Marauders of the Class A-Advanced Florida State League, along with fellow starting pitcher Jameson Taillon, the Pirates' first selection in the 2010 MLB draft. Cole was named a FSL Mid-Season All-Star. He was promoted to the Altoona Curve of the Class AA Eastern League on June 15, 2012. He was named to appear in the 2012 All-Star Futures Game. In twelve starts with the Curve, Cole pitched to a 2.90 ERA, before the Pirates promoted him to the Indianapolis Indians of the Class AAA International League on August 29, 2012.

Prior to the 2013 season, Cole was ranked as the ninth best prospect in baseball by MLB.com. Cole played for the Indianapolis Indians to start the 2013 season. Cole pitched to a 5–3 record and a 2.91 ERA in 12 starts for Indianapolis.

Pittsburgh Pirates (2013–2017)

Due to injuries to James McDonald and Wandy Rodríguez, the Pirates promoted Cole to the major leagues, to make his MLB debut on June 11, 2013. He also recorded his first career hit, a 2-run single with the bases loaded in his first career plate appearance. Cole pitched  innings being charged with two earned runs but got the win as the Pirates won over the  San Francisco Giants, 8–2. Cole became the fourth pitcher since 1920 to drive in 2+ runs and earn the win in his Major League debut. Cole is the first Pirate to start his career with wins in his first four starts since Nick Maddox in 1907. He was the fifth pitcher for any team to accomplish the feat in the past 40 years, joining  Rich Gale of the 1978 Royals, Kaz Ishii of the 2002 Dodgers, Jered Weaver of the 2006 Angels and Scott Lewis of the 2008 Indians.

Cole was voted the National League (NL) Rookie of the Month for September 2013. On the month, Cole had a 4–0 record and led all rookies with a 1.69 ERA and 39 strikeouts. Cole had a 10–7 record and a 3.22 ERA in 19 starts for Pittsburgh in 2013. Cole started Game Two of the 2013 National League Division Series, going six innings allowing two hits, one earned run, and five strikeouts, and ultimately defeating the St. Louis Cardinals. The Pirates chose Cole to start the deciding Game 5 over A. J. Burnett. The Cardinals won the game, and the series.

After focusing on his fastball during his rookie season, Cole entered 2014 spring training working on improving his curveball and slider. Cole had been a durable pitcher in 2014 pitching  innings, but manager Clint Hurdle acknowledged on June 7 that Cole would miss at least one start with shoulder fatigue. Cole was placed on the 15-day disabled list the next day, and activated on June 28.

On September 7, 2014, Cole hit his first career home run at Wrigley Field off of Chicago Cubs pitcher Blake Parker. On September 23, Cole helped the Pirates clinch a second consecutive playoff berth by beating Alex Wood and the Atlanta Braves.

Cole won the NL Pitcher of the Month Award for April 2015, after going 4–0 with a 1.76 ERA and 35 strikeouts in  innings pitched for the month. He was the Pirates' choice to start the 2015 National League Wild Card Game against the Chicago Cubs but took the loss after giving up four earned runs on six hits and a walk in five innings pitched.

On June 14, 2016, Cole was placed on the 15-day disabled list due to a right triceps strain. On July 27, Cole pitched his first complete game against the Seattle Mariners. In 2017, Cole was 12–12 with a 4.26 ERA, as he led the National League with 33 starts.

The Pirates and Cole reached agreement in January 2018 on a one-year, $6.75 million contract.

Houston Astros (2018–2019)

On January 13, 2018, the Pirates traded Cole to the Houston Astros for Joe Musgrove, Michael Feliz, Colin Moran and Jason Martin.

On April 29, 2018, Cole struck out 12 hitters in a game against the Oakland Athletics that resulted in a no-decision but an Astros win. In doing so, Cole broke the Astros strikeout record for April with 61 strikeouts in the first month. He finished his first month in an Astros uniform going 2–1 with 61 strikeouts and a 1.73 ERA in 41.2 innings pitched. On May 4, against the Arizona Diamondbacks Cole struck out 16, allowed only one hit, and pitched his first career shutout as the Astros won 8–0.

Cole was elected to his first American League All-Star appearance (2nd overall). Cole did not appear in the game but finished the first half of the season with a 10–2 record with a 2.52 ERA and 177 strikeouts. He finished the season with 278 strikeouts, a new career high and good for second-most in the American League behind teammate Justin Verlander, a 15–5 record, and a 2.88 ERA, his best since the 2015 season. He led the majors in strikeouts per 9 innings (12.40). In Game 2 of the 2018 American League Division Series against the Cleveland Indians, Cole struck out 12 and walked none in seven innings in a 3–1 victory. Cole became the second pitcher to strikeout at least 12 hitters with no walks in the postseason, after Tom Seaver in the 1973 National League Championship Series.

On September 8, 2019, his 29th birthday, Cole became the second pitcher ever to strike out 14 or more hitters in three consecutive games. On September 18, 2019, Cole struck out his 300th batter of the season, becoming the third Astros pitcher to strike out 300 batters in a single season, after J. R. Richard and Mike Scott.  Cole became the second-fastest pitcher to register 300 strikeouts in terms of innings pitched.  His  innings trailed only Randy Johnson, who achieved the feat in  innings in 2001. The following start, September 24, 2019, Cole struck out 14 batters to break the single-season strikeout record for any Astros pitcher, bringing his total to 316 on the year, and allowing only two singles in his appearance of seven scoreless innings. In his next start on September 29, 2019, Cole set an MLB record with his ninth consecutive outings with at least 10 strikeouts.

Cole's performance since February 2018 and through the 2019 season was markedly different from his earlier seasons, due to intervention by the Astros management and coaching staff. Cole vastly reduced the number of two-seam fastballs he threw, threw more into the top of the strike zone, and increased the spin rate of his fastball.

Cole finished the 2019 season with a 20–5 record and a 0.895 WHIP. He led the American League with a 2.50 ERA, and led the major leagues in strikeouts (326), strikeout percentage (39.9%), and strikeouts per nine innings (13.818). He became the first full-time starting pitcher in MLB history to average more than one and a half strikeouts per inning in a season. He finished second in voting for the 2019 Cy Young Award, behind Verlander with 159 points to Verlander's 171.

New York Yankees (2020–present)

2020
On December 18, 2019, the Yankees signed Cole to a franchise record nine-year, $324 million contract. Cole's contract is the largest signed by a pitcher, topping the $245 million, seven-year contract signed by Stephen Strasburg. Cole's contract has an average annual value of $36 million, which also represents the highest average annual value of any player contract in Major League Baseball, eclipsing the previous average annual value record set by Mike Trout, at an average annual value of $35.5 million. The contract also allows Cole to opt out and become a free agent again after the fifth year; however, if he attempts to do so, the Yankees can choose to prevent him from doing so by adding an additional year and $36 million to his contract, which would bring the total length and value of the contract to 10 years and $360 million.

On July 23, 2020, Cole made his Yankees debut as an Opening Day starting pitcher throwing 5 innings against the Washington Nationals and allowing just one hit, a home run by Adam Eaton. Cole's regular-season winning streak reached 20, the third-longest in MLB history, but his streak ended on August 26, 2020, when he took a loss against the Atlanta Braves. Through August 4, 2020, his 242 strikeouts are a Major League record since his last loss. He would lose three decisions in a row, but on September 11, 2020, Cole ended his 3-game losing streak by throwing a 2-hitter complete game shutout against the Baltimore Orioles. As it was a doubleheader, the game only went 7 innings. He ended his first season as a Yankee with a 7–3 record, throwing to a 2.84 ERA in 73 innings and striking out 94.

On September 29, 2020, in his Yankees playoff debut, during Game 1 of the wild card series against the Cleveland Indians, Cole struck out 13 batters without a walk, tying Tom Seaver (1973 NLCS Game 1) and second most in Yankees franchise history. He also became the first Major Leaguer in history to win three postseason games with 12 or more strikeouts. Only Roger Clemens (15 K's) has fanned more in a postseason start with the Yankees. In the 2020 ALDS against the Tampa Bay Rays, he was the winning pitcher in Game 1, and received a no-decision in the decisive game 5, which the Yankees would go on to lose.

2021
On April 12, after recording 8 strikeouts and retiring 15 batters in a row in a game against the Toronto Blue Jays, Cole became the Yankees pitcher with the most strikeouts in the first three starts of the season of all time, matching David Cone (1997) with 29. On May 12, 2021, Cole notched his 1,500th career strikeout, becoming the second-fastest pitcher in history to reach the milestone behind Randy Johnson.

Cole finished the 2021 season with a 3.23 ERA and 243 strikeouts in  innings over 30 starts. He led the American League with 16 wins and a 5.93 strikeout-to-walk ratio. He finished second in American League Cy Young Award voting behind Robbie Ray.

In the 2021 American League Wild Card Game at Fenway Park, Cole pitched two innings and gave up three earned runs and two home runs in a loss to the Boston Red Sox.

On November 23, Cole was named a First Team selection for the All-MLB Team, which was determined by a fan vote and a panel consisting of media members, former players, and baseball officials. It was his third consecutive All-MLB selection, as he was on the First Team in 2019 with the Houston Astros, and appeared on the Second Team with the Yankees in 2020.

2022
Against the Minnesota Twins on June 9, Cole allowed three consecutive home runs the first three batters he faced. He allowed 5 total home runs in only 2.1 innings, but the Yankees came back and won 10–7. While playing against the Seattle Mariners on August 3, Cole allowed 6 runs in the first inning on 3 home runs. It was the most runs allowed in the first inning at home since Phil Hughes back in 2013.

On September 28, 2022, facing the Toronto Blue Jays, Cole recorded his 248th strikeout for the 2022 regular season, tying the New York Yankees single season strike out record set by Ron Guidry in 1978.  On October 4, 2022, Cole recorded his 249th strikeout of the season against the Texas Rangers, surpassing Guidry for the franchise record, and then became the first Yankees pitcher in history to strikeout 250+ batters in a single season. He made 33 starts in 2022 with an MLB-leading 257 strikeouts, a 13–8 record, a 3.50 ERA, and an AL-leading 33 home runs allowed. He also became the first right-handed pitcher in New York Yankees history to solely lead all of MLB in strikeouts in a single season that year.

Pitching style
He also throws a slider, knuckle curve, changeup, and as of 2022 has reintroduced his cutter which is a pitch he has not thrown since college. Between 2017 and 2018, due to his increased spin rate and a more complete arm deceleration and follow-through, his fastball got a lower WHIP, and has used his sinker less often, no longer "pitching to contact". Like Pedro Martinez, he throws from a low three-quarters position. In the first round of 2019 ALDS, his strikeout pitches were high fastballs, sliders and knuckle balls which curve down and away from right-handed batters.

Records
 MLB record for most consecutive strikeouts without issuing a walk (61) - 2021
 Most strikeouts by a Houston Astros pitcher in a single season (326) - 2019
 Most strikeouts by a New York Yankees pitcher in a single season (257) - 2022

Personal life
Cole is the elder son of Mark and Sharon. He has one younger sister, Erin. Erin attended UCLA, where she played for the Bruins' soccer team. Cole grew up as a fan of the New York Yankees, as his father – raised in Syracuse, New York – passed down his affinity for the Yankees to his son.

Cole attended the 2001 World Series, in which the Yankees took part. He held a sign that said "YANKEE FAN TODAY TOMORROW FOREVER", and a photograph shared by Newsday went viral in 2019 when news of his signing with the Yankees was reported. He brought the sign to his introductory press conference with the Yankees.

In the same introductory press conference with the Yankees, Cole thanked the late Marvin Miller, the former executive director of the Major League Baseball Players Association and National Baseball Hall of Fame inductee, along with late Curt Flood, for their pivotal roles in establishing free agency for Major League Baseball players.

Cole is married to Amy Crawford, a former UCLA softball player and the sister of San Francisco Giants shortstop Brandon Crawford. They met when they attended UCLA. On January 1, 2020, Amy announced their first pregnancy. Their son Caden Gerrit Cole was born on June 30, 2020. Their second son Everett was born on January 2, 2023. They reside in Greenwich, Connecticut.

Cole has a passion for cooking, and he and his wife have a blog where they discuss their favorite recipes.

Cole is musically inclined, and plays piano and guitar. In addition, Cole can read sheet music fluently.

On December 4, 2020, Cole was elected to the MLBPA's Executive Subcommittee.

See also

 
 Hickok Belt
 Houston Astros award winners and league leaders
 New York Yankees award winners and league leaders
 List of Houston Astros team records
 List of New York Yankees team records
 List of Major League Baseball annual shutout leaders
 List of Major League Baseball career WHIP leaders
 List of people from Newport Beach, California
 List of University of California, Los Angeles people
 List of World Series starting pitchers

References

External links

 UCLA Bruins bio

1990 births
Living people
Altoona Curve players
American League All-Stars
American League ERA champions
American League strikeout champions
American League wins champions
Baseball players from California
Bradenton Marauders players
Houston Astros players
Indianapolis Indians players
Major League Baseball pitchers
Mesa Solar Sox players
National League All-Stars
New York Yankees players
Pittsburgh Pirates players
UCLA Bruins baseball players
United States national baseball team players
Sportspeople from Newport Beach, California
American people of Irish descent
American people of Italian descent